Liepkalnis Winter Sports Centre is an alpine skiing area in Vilnius, Lithuania. It has 10 lifts and 9 groomed ski runs. All the pistes are lit and equipped with artificial snow making equipment.

History 
The hill has been used by the alpine skiing enthusiasts since at least 1982, and it has been continually raised by piling rubble until 2000, mostly by efforts of the skiing enthusiast Laimis Janutėnas. Eventually people started calling the mountain by his name, and in 2004 the Vilnius City Municipality officially named the hill Laimio kalnas. The first ski lift was launched in 1984.

In 2013, the control of the ski area was given to the Lithuanian-Latvian JSC UAB "Trade State", which invested around 1 million euros into lighting, snowmaking, snow grooming equipment and built multiple new lifts.  Along with the lifts and snow grooming infrastructure, the company operates a ski school and a ski and snowboard rental service.

References

External links 
 http://liepkalnis.lt/

Ski areas and resorts in Lithuania
Sports venues in Vilnius